Rogue Squadron is a fictional starfighter squadron in the Star Wars franchise. The crew is mostly composed of surviving members of Red Squadron, the Rebel  attack force that Luke Skywalker joins during the Battle of Yavin in Star Wars (1977). The squadron appears in The Empire Strikes Back (1980) as Rogue Group.

Rogue Squadron is prominently featured in the comic book series Star Wars: X-wing Rogue Squadron as well as the ten-volume novel series Star Wars: X-wing, and the Rogue Squadron video game series. The unit is depicted as consisting of "the best pilots and the best fighters". Following the release of the Star Wars anthology series film, Rogue One, it was established in other works that the squadron was named in honor of the Rogue One squad who sacrificed themselves to obtain the plans to the Death Star.

Depiction in film

A New Hope (1977)
Red Squadron, the forerunner of Rogue Squadron, is first featured as a Rebel Alliance division in A New Hope (1977) during the attack on the Galactic Empire's first Death Star. This appearance features many notable pilots, including Biggs Darklighter ("Red Three"), Jek Porkins ("Red Six"), Wedge Antilles ("Red Two"), and Luke Skywalker ("Red Five"). The squadron went on to appear in The Empire Strikes Back at the Battle of Hoth and in Return of the Jedi during the attack on the second Death Star. The squadron was never a prominent feature of these films, and was rarely referred to as "Rogue Squadron" (rather, the "Red Squadron" designation is used).

In the films' plot, Red Squadron is essential to the destruction of the Death Star at the Battle of Yavin, where they engaged in a dogfight against Darth Vader. They use X-wing starfighters for the assault. Jek Porkins, Biggs Darklighter, and most of the Squadron dies. Wedge leaves too damaged to continue. Luke would have died, had he not been saved by Han Solo and Chewbacca piloting the Millennium Falcon, and giving Luke time to deliver the shot that destroyed the Death Star. Luke Skywalker and Wedge Antilles are the only members of Red Squadron to survive the assault.

The Empire Strikes Back (1980)
During The Empire Strikes Back, the Rogue Squadron on the ice planet Hoth has the burden of defending Echo Base with new pilots added to their roster, like Derek Klivian and Tycho Celchu. During the Battle of Hoth, the twelve snowspeeders of the Rogues gave the Rebels enough time to evacuate Echo Base and were destroyed later in the battle. After the evacuation of Hoth, Antilles took command during the absence of Skywalker while he trained with Yoda at Dagobah. After the events of The Empire Strikes Back, Skywalker and Antilles formed a squadron of twelve units around the core group and the Rogue Squadron was formed. Antilles often commanded the squadron when Luke had important off-flight missions.

Return of the Jedi (1983)
During the Battle of Endor in Return of the Jedi, Rogue Squadron was dissolved and absorbed into the general fleet and Antilles took the role of Red Leader, in memory of the Battle of Yavin. Luke is busy helping on the ground as a Jedi, and Wedge destroys the second Death Star with the aid of Lando Calrissian and Nien Nunb, who pilot the Millennium Falcon.

Rogue One (2016)
The anthology film Rogue One, set shortly before A New Hope, features many of the pilots who fought on the Death Star fighting on the battle of Scarif, where Jyn Erso leads a group of Rebels called Rogue One, in an on-foot mission to steal the plans of the original Death Star. Unable to leave the planet, team Rogue One beams the plans to Leia's ship. Minutes later, all Rogue One members are killed by the Death Star. Since the release of the prequel, the Rogue Squadron has been hinted and later revealed to have named itself in the memory of the Rogue One team.

Rogue Squadron (unproduced)
During Disney Investor Day 2020, Lucasfilm revealed that Patty Jenkins would direct a film titled Rogue Squadron, which was scheduled to be released on Christmas 2023. According to StarWars.com, the film "will introduce a new generation of starfighter pilots as they earn their wings and risk their lives in a boundary-pushing, high-speed thrill-ride, and move the saga into the future era of the galaxy." According to Jenkins, the film will be "something original with great influence from the games and the books. There's a lot of things being acknowledged and understood about the greatness of all of those things, but yes, it's an original story and I'm so psyched to do it." It was announced on November 8, 2021 that production was delayed indefinitely.  In September 2022, Disney removed Rogue Squadron from their release schedule. By March 2023, the film was announced to be cancelled altogether.

Notable pilots
These are the pilots featured in the films and the canon of Star Wars.

Garven Dreis
He is the leader of Red Squadron during the battle of Yavin 4 in A New Hope (played by Drewe Henley).
He is killed by Vader.

Luke Skywalker

Luke Skywalker's debut with the Rebel Alliance came as Red Five at the Battle of Yavin, as portrayed in A New Hope. After his destruction of the Death Star, he founded Rogue Squadron with Wedge's help using the Rebels' best X-wing pilots as shown in the video game Rogue Squadron and proceeded to have a long and distinguished flying career with the group. By the time of Return of the Jedi, Luke was focusing on his training as a Jedi Knight and had thus handed command of Rogue Squadron to Wedge.

The last mission of Rogue Squadron takes place six years after the Battle of Endor, during Dark Empire.

Wedge Antilles

Although Luke Skywalker was the first commander of Rogue Squadron, Antilles is often considered the "face" of the squadron due to his tenure as its leader. He appears in the films A New Hope, The Empire Strikes Back, and Return of the Jedi, in which he commands the squadron. When seeing the Death Star for the first time in A New Hope, Wedge utters the line "Look at the size of that thing!"

Wedge has a unique situation casting-wise. Colin Higgins portrayed him during the Rebel briefing for the Battle of Yavin, where he expresses his doubt that even a computer could shoot a proton torpedo down the Death Star's thermal exhaust port. In every other scene, Denis Lawson portrays Wedge. Wedge appears in season 3 of Star Wars: Rebels, where he is voiced by Nathan Kress.

Biggs Darklighter

Biggs Darklighter briefly appeared in A New Hope played by Garrick Hagon. Biggs was in the Battle of Yavin scene, where he joined his childhood friend Luke Skywalker and Luke's other wingman, Wedge, in their attack run on the first Death Star.

Biggs had a larger role in earlier drafts of the script for the movie and several of the additional scenes appeared in the novelization. His additional scenes include a conversation with Luke on Tatooine where Biggs tells Luke of his secret desire to join the Rebel Alliance despite his training at the Imperial Academy. This scene was deleted from A New Hope, but the book Inside the Worlds of the Star Wars Trilogy depicts the missing scene at Tosche Station, and it can be seen in its entirety on the encyclopedic Star Wars: Behind the Magic CD-ROM and on the Blu-ray release of A New Hope. Biggs also shows up on Yavin 4 in the Rebel base hangar where he is reunited with his childhood best friend Luke and helped convince Red Squadron to allow Luke to join the squadron about to depart towards the Battle of Yavin. Biggs assures Red Squadron leader Garven Dreis that Luke can handle the X-wing, calling him the best bush pilot in the Outer Rim. This scene was reintroduced in the 1997 re-release of the film. However, a line in which Dreis referred to Luke's father Anakin and said that "if he had his skill he would do fine" remained on the cutting room floor. While flanking Luke's X-wing on its decisive attack run, Biggs was shot down and killed by Darth Vader.

Biggs has a larger role in the Legends non-canonical storyline. In the radio version, Kale Browne provided the voice of Biggs. According to a Dark Horse four-issue comic series in Star Wars: Empire spotlighting Biggs entitled Darklighter, Biggs was a longtime friend of Luke's on Tatooine. Biggs left Tatooine to be trained as an Imperial pilot, and during this training, he heard rumors of the Death Star from fellow trainees. After several months training, he was assigned as first mate on the Imperial starship Rand Ecliptic, with an old enemy named Derek Klivian (nicknamed Hobbie) as second mate. He came back to visit Tatooine to tell his friends and family of his new assignment but only tells Luke and his family of his hope to join the Rebel Alliance. During the events of A New Hope, Biggs is planning a mutiny of the Rand Ecliptic, not realizing that several mutinies are being planned by several different groups. He joins forces with Hobbie, one of the leaders, and the two go AWOL to Yavin 4. Biggs becomes a part of the Alliance's missions to steal their first R2 units and X-wings, which they receive just days before the Battle of Yavin. Before going to battle, Biggs saves Hobbie's life by finding medicine for a strange disease Hobbie caught on Yavin 4, which the Rebellion did not have a cure for. The New Republic later named a military base on Coruscant in Biggs's honor.

Jek "Piggy" Porkins
Jek Tono Porkins is a famously overweight Red Squadron pilot whose death is depicted in A New Hope (played by William Hootkins) when his X-wing is destroyed after being hit by a piece of a broken laser battery crashing into the star fighter's frame.

Porkins gained prominence in the Legends non-canonical literature, most notably Stackpole's X-wing series. He has also been occasionally parodied in popular media, most notably in the Family Guy Star Wars spoof Blue Harvest, in which he is depicted as being too fat to fit in his fighter and crashes.

Corran Horn
In the Star Wars Legends timeline, Corran Horn fought with Rogue Squadron. Force-sensitive, Horn helped Rogue Squadron win the second Battle of Borelias, and was captured after helping capture Coruscant from the warlord Ysanne Isard.

Wes Janson
A minor character in the original films, Janson only appears in The Empire Strikes Back in the role of Wedge Antilles' gunner at the Battle of Hoth. He manages to take out the first AT-AT, emphasized by a terse "Cable detached!" (preceded by "Cable out, let her go!", and Wedge's "Detach cable!"), his only speaking role in the films.

In the Legends non-canonical literature, Janson was stranded with Wedge in the 1983 Marvel Star Wars comic "Hoth Stuff!" some time after the Battle of Hoth. He was then killed by scavengers, and Wedge used one of their ships to escape the planet.

Janson is featured as a major character in Michael A. Stackpole's X-Wing comic book series as alternately Wedge and Hobbie's wingman and an integral member of the squadron. Aaron Allston included the character in his installments in the X-wing novel series which followed from the comics, although Janson in those novels is prominent as a member of Wraith Squadron, not Rogue Squadron. Janson also fought against the Yuuzhan Vong during the New Jedi Order series of novels, and kept an eye on Han Solo after the death of Chewbacca. He was known as a skilled pilot and an expert shot, and personality-wise is known to be a joker.  In his early days as part of the Rebel Alliance was mainly a gunner in the two seated version of the Y-wing because of his shooting ability. His first combat kill was New Republic pilot Kell Tainer's father during a botched mission where Doran was about to stray into an Imperial radar scan. Despite repeated attempts to get him to change course, Janson was forced to shoot him down to save the rest of the squadron. In the Wraith Squadron Series he was the first to implement the saying "Yub Yub Commander." as a joke to Wedge after fooling him during the pilot interviews. The rest of the squadron soon followed and Wedge was hounded by it for many years to come.

Tycho Celchu
Celchu never appears by name in the original film series, although he is attributed as the A-wing pilot that acts as a decoy for Lando Calrissian during the attack run on the second Death Star.

In the Legends non-canonical storyline Celchu, plays a major role in Stackpole's X-wing series, and also appears in numerous other novels, all of which give him a rich character background. Celchu was an Imperial TIE fighter pilot that defected to the Rebel Alliance after his homeworld, Alderaan (also the homeworld of Princess Leia), was destroyed by the first Death Star, killing all of his immediate family and his fiancée. Celchu's Imperial past drives much of the plot of Stackpole's X-wing novels, as he is continually suspected of being an undercover Imperial agent. After the battle of Coruscant, Celchu was put on trial for treason and the murder of Corran Horn, but the prosecution dropped the case when Horn returned from the Lusankya. Celchu also holds the noteworthy distinction of being one of very few Rebel pilots to have flown in the Hoth, Endor and Bakura campaigns. This is a very rare accomplishment, and one that is matched by longtime wingman and friend Wedge Antillies.

Derek "Hobbie" Klivian
Klivian flies as Luke Skywalker's wingman during the Battle of Hoth. Originally doomed to die when his snowspeeder crashes into General Veers' walker, his life was spared after that scene from the fourth draft was cut.  His first film appearance, was in Leia's briefing before the battle, when he questions the plan by rhetorically asking, "Two fighters against a Star Destroyer?". Hobbie appears in season 3 of Rebels, where he is voiced by Trevor Devall.

In the non-canonical Legends literature and the Rogue Squadron video game series, it is said Hobbie is not only the most reckless pilot, he's also the luckiest, having crashed more fighters than all of Rogue Squadron and coming away from each of them unscathed. He's generally the most dour of all the pilots, having a bleak outlook on life. Despite this, Hobbie has a close camaraderie and friendship with Wes Janson, and often becomes involved in Janson's elaborate pranks and jokes at the expense of other pilots (especially Wedge). Hobbie's sense of humor is extremely dry and sardonic, making for a good counterpoint to Janson's flamboyant and often silly wit.

Dak Ralter
Dak Ralter is depicted in The Empire Strikes Back as Luke Skywalker's gunner. He was killed in battle by a flak explosion from an AT-AT's heavy guns during the Battle of Hoth.

In the Legends non-canonical storyline, he is featured on the video game Star Wars: Rogue Squadron, with Luke Skywalker saying that Dak "reminded him of a younger version of himself." He was the son of political prisoners.

Zev Senesca
Zev Senesca, callsign Rogue Two, appears in The Empire Strikes Back, and is the pilot who locates Han Solo and Luke Skywalker after they get lost on Hoth at the beginning of the film. In Rogue Squadron, he had been fighting longer than any other Rogues and had quite a few stories to tell. Like Dak, he joined the rebellion for personal and political reasons. He is killed when his speeder is shot down by Imperial walkers during the Battle of Hoth.

Legends
With the 2012 acquisition of Lucasfilm by The Walt Disney Company, most of the licensed Star Wars novels and comics produced since the originating 1977 film were rebranded as Star Wars Legends and declared non-canon to the franchise in April 2014.

In the Legends non-canonical storyline, the X-wing comic series, written by Michael A. Stackpole and published by Dark Horse Comics, were the first works of Star Wars literature to focus on the adventures and exploits of the squadron. The comic series picked up with the reformation of the squadron after the Battle of Endor. Stackpole went on to novelize the squadron's tale in his X-wing book series, which initially spanned four volumes. Stackpole is credited as the creator of the character Corran Horn, who later starred in his own first-person novel, I, Jedi, also written by Stackpole. Horn later became a popular character in the Expanded Universe, playing a major part in several New Jedi Order novels. By the time of the events of The New Jedi Order, Horn was a Jedi Knight and no longer a member of the squadron, but the Rogues are still a vital fighting force and command a presence in several of the New Jedi Order novels as well. The squadron is also the focus of the Rogue Squadron video game series.

In Dark Horse's eponymous Star Wars series (2013–14), set in the months after A New Hope, Leia has begun calling the former Red Squadron "Stealth Squadron", but Wedge reveals to Luke that he prefers the name "Rogue Squadron". After A New Hope, the squadron is operated as two groups. The first was the Renegade Flight under Commander Narra, the squadron leader, and the second was the Rogue Flight under Luke Skywalker. As the Rogues became more autonomous, they became a group with no standing orders, ready any time or place for urgent missions that would arise. Their core was Luke Skywalker, Wedge Antilles, Zev Senesca, and Wes Janson. The Renegade Flight is eventually destroyed before The Empire Strikes Back on an escort mission with a convoy carrying supplies for the Rebel Base. The Rogues on Hoth had now the burden to defend Echo Base alone although new pilots were already added to their roster, like Derek Klivian and Tycho Celchu. During the Battle of Hoth, the Rogues had to add many "guest" members into their squadron.  The twelve snowspeeders of the Rogues gave the Rebels enough time to evacuate Echo Base and were destroyed later in the battle. Before Return of the Jedi, one of Luke's last missions was the Battle of Gall against the Empire, in an attempt to capture the bounty hunters who had abducted Han Solo. After Return of the Jedi, the squadron was hastily and temporarily reformed by Antilles with the best rebel pilots in order to defend the planet Bakura. Rogue Squadron was now a lean team of six units: Antilles, Janson, Klivian, Celchu, Plourr Ilo and Dllr Nep.  One of the important missions during the New Republic's creation was the failed rescue mission of Sate Pestage, which bolstered the fame of New Republic.

Since Janson and Klivian moved on to train new pilots and squadrons, Antilles had to reinvent Rogue Squadron, now with pilots from a wide variety of planets, clearly for political reasons. This "new" Rogue Squadron destroyed some of the Imperial forces led by Ysanne Isard and contributed heavily to the retaking of Coruscant. After resigning from the Alliance military, the squadron fought in the Bacta War to retake the world of Thyferra from Isard. During that time, Klivian led a temporary Rogue Squadron in the absence of the "true" Rogue Squadron. Upon their return from Thyferra, Antilles turned command over to Tycho Celchu and founded Wraith Squadron. Antilles commanded both squadrons against Warlord Zsinj and after that he returned to his command as Rogue Leader to battle against Thrawn, Krennel, Palpatine's clones and lead the team to other battles.

The squadron played a role in the Battle for Mon Calamari during Admiral Daala's campaign against the New Republic.  Around this time, former squadron leader Luke Skywalker was teaching his first class of Jedi Knights, including Rogue Squadron member Corran Horn. The squadron was led by Tycho Celchu after the campaign against Krennel, and was then led by Gavin Darklighter during the Yuuzhan Vong War.  Later on during a brewing civil war within the Republic, the squadron would temporarily be led by Jaina Solo.

Notable pilots
The following characters are featured within the Legends non-canonical storyline, but have not appeared on the canon. They are featured along the pilots featured on the canon.

Gavin Darklighter
Gavin Darklighter, Biggs' cousin, joined Rogue Squadron at 16 years old and quickly proved to be a more than capable pilot. He became fast friends with Corran Horn, who helped him out of a situation where he was the "worst" pilot in the squadron. Darklighter was wounded during the Imperial invasion of Talasea in the Morobe system.  During the Battle of Coruscant, Gavin became emotionally involved with Asyr Sei'Lar, a Bothan who would later join Rogue Squadron.  Gavin was promoted to the rank of captain after the death of Grand Admiral Thrawn, and was promoted to Colonel and given command of Rogue Squadron at an unspecified date before the Yuuzhan Vong invasion. Gavin would continue to move up the ranks during the Second Galactic Civil War and beyond, at one point leading the Galactic Alliance Marines.

Corran Horn
Corran Horn was invented by writer Michael Stackpole for the X-wing series. Horn eventually became a major character in the Expanded Universe, starring in the novel I, Jedi, as well as several New Jedi Order novels (in which he is a Jedi Knight, not a Rogue Squadron pilot). Horn hails from Corellia, and originally worked as a security officer for CorSec before fleeing from the pursuit of Kirtan Loor, an Imperial intelligence officer. Horn became an accomplished pilot, and remained with the Rogues for some time after discovering his Force-sensitive heritage. He later trained to become a Jedi Knight after his wife was kidnapped in I, Jedi. During the events of the Yuuzhan Vong War, Horn was promoted to Jedi Master and eventually went on to serve on the Jedi Council as one of the most powerful and prominent Jedi of his time.
He is also notable for carrying one of only a few "dual-phase" lightsabers known to exist. The weapon was crafted by Horn during the time line of the I, Jedi novel based on designs given to him by Rostek Horn. These were possibly the same plans that his distant forefather, Keiran Halcyon, had created for his own dual-phase lightsaber.

Kasan Moor
Kasan Moor appears in Rogue Squadron, originally as a formidable opponent of the squadron. She is a decorated Imperial TIE Interceptor pilot and leader of the famous 128th TIE Interceptor Squadron, but despite her record, like Tycho, her faith in the Imperial cause has been severely shaken after the Death Star's destruction of her homeworld of Alderaan. She is recruited during the Liberation of Gerrard V, and when she joins, she becomes Rogue Squadron's lone female pilot during the game and a treasure trove of information on the Imperials. Olivia Hussey provides her voice.

Cultural impact
Several games in the Final Fantasy series have a pair of minor characters named after Biggs and Wedge Antilles.

References
Footnotes

Citations

External links 
 

Star Wars: Rogue Squadron
Characters created by George Lucas
Star Wars Anthology characters
Star Wars Skywalker Saga characters
Fictional fighter pilots
Fictional military organizations
Fictional military personnel in films